The Bloom of Yesterday is a 2016 German-Austrian comedy film directed by Chris Kraus.

Cast

Reception 
The film won the Grand Prize and the Audience Award at the 2016 Tokyo International Film Festival and subsequently won several awards and nominations.  Martin Schwickert, of Zeit Online, said the dialogue had "almost Woody Allen's brilliance and speed."

References

External links 

2016 films
2016 comedy films
Austrian comedy films
German comedy films
2010s German films